Scott McGregor (born 22 October 1957) is an Australian actor, television presenter and is now the managing director of the tour company 'Railway Adventures', which specialises in international and domestic tours by rail.

Early life 
Scott McGregor was born in Orange, New South Wales where his parents Douglas and Joyce McGregor owned a farm and managed The Central Western Daily newspaper. In 1969 the family moved to Mudgee when his parents purchased the Mudgee Guardian.

Scott was educated at Mudgee High School and The Scots College in Sydney. He commenced studying communications at the then Mitchell College of Advanced Education in Bathurst. Now part of Charles Sturt University, before being accepted into the National Institute of Dramatic Art where he graduated in 1979.

Acting career 

In the 1980s McGregor had leading stage acting roles in productions of the Perth Playhouse, Queensland Theatre Company, Marion St Theatre and Nimrod Company. From 1980 to early 2000s he had acting roles in many Australian television series including The Young Doctors, Skyways, The Sullivans, Cop Shop, A Country Practice, Sons and Daughters, Police Rescue, Home and Away, Water Rats and All Saints.

During the 1980s he had lead roles in the epic ABC mini-series 1915, the Coral Island and Chase Through The Night and was nominated for the best actor award in the 1983 Logies for his role as Walter Gilchrist in 1915. He had numerous film and radio appearances and was one of the Bouncers in the highly successful national tour of the play of the same name in 1985/86. 

From the 1997 he started turning to presenting lifestyle television as a travel and collectables presenter on The Lifestyle Channel programs Out and About, Australian Living and Australian Collections. From 2000 to 2003 he was a DIY presenter on Better Homes and Gardens and from 2002 to 2004 hosted the home renovation series Room for Improvement on the Seven Network.

In 1999 he combined television presenting with his interest in railways by hosting the travel series Railway Adventures Across Australia for Channel 10. In 2004 he followed up with the series Down The Line with Scott McGregor covering railway journeys in Australia, New Zealand and Vietnam. Both series have sold extensively in markets around the world and have had enormously successful video and DVD releases.

In 2005 McGregor presented Australian Icon Towns made for The History Channel. A second series was broadcast from January 2007.

Interest in railways 

McGregor had a keen interest in railways since childhood. From the 1980s he started collecting railway memorabilia, including several vintage railway carriages which he restored on his property, "Ruwenzori", near Mudgee NSW. By 1989 he had collected so much he decided to sell some and opened a stall called Off The Rails at the now closed Chelsea House antiques emporium in Camperdown, New South Wales. Branches were later opened at Sydney's Central Railway Station and in Balmain. In 1992 a new Off The Rails shop was opened in Newtown. It moved again to a larger shop and restoration workshop at Camperdown.

In 2005 McGregor opened his country property as tourist accommodation. Ruwenzori Retreat is perched on the Great Dividing Range north of Mudgee and is made up of a collection of 9 vintage carriages. 
A number of which date back to the 1890s and the 3 main carriages are restored as the luxury guest accommodation. The 50 acre property also has station buildings, track, signals, a plethora of memorabilia and a network of bush tracks. Ruwenzori Retreat has featured on TV programs such Getaway, Today, World's Most Extreme Homes, and many others. McGregor and his Ruwenzori railway collection have also appeared on the ABC TV program Collectors.

Railway Adventures 
In 2007, McGregor began hosting Railway Adventure tours in conjunction with Sydney-based travel company Renaissance Tours to a variety of destinations in Australia and overseas including Vietnam, Eastern Europe, Japan, India, New Zealand and North Queensland.

In 2012, he established his own travel company 'Railway Adventures' Page text., dedicated to providing rail-themed tours in Australia and overseas. Since then he has hosted over 150 tours to destinations far and wide, together with a growing band of tour leaders and hosts. McGregor has turned his love and hobby of trains into a successful career.

References

External links 
 
 Off The Rails Productions
 https://railwayadventures.travel/

1957 births
Australian television presenters
Australian male television actors
Australian male stage actors
Living people
People educated at Scots College (Sydney)
Charles Sturt University alumni
People from Mudgee